Graboštani is a village in Croatia. It is connected by the D224 highway.

References

Populated places in Sisak-Moslavina County